The Supreme Council, Scottish Rite, Northern Jurisdiction oversees the Scottish Rite of Freemasonry in fifteen states: Connecticut, Delaware, Illinois, Indiana, Maine, Massachusetts, Michigan, New Jersey, New Hampshire, New York, Ohio, Pennsylvania, Rhode Island, Wisconsin and Vermont. 

Formed in 1813, the Northern Jurisdiction is divided into "Valleys" (as opposed to the Southern Jurisdiction, which divides itself into "Orients").  Each Valley has up to four subordinate bodies, and each body confers a set of degrees.

History
Although most of the thirty-three degrees of the Scottish Rite existed in parts of previous degree systems, the Scottish Rite did not come into being until the formation of the Mother Supreme Council at Charleston, South Carolina, in May 1801.

On May 1, 1813, an officer from the Supreme Council at Charleston initiated several New York Masons into the Thirty-third Degree and organized a Supreme Council for the "Northern Masonic District and Jurisdiction". On May 21, 1814 this Supreme Council reopened and proceeded to "nominate, elect, appoint, install and proclaim in due, legal and ample form" the elected officers "as forming the second Grand and Supreme Council...". Finally, the charter of this organization (written January 7, 1815) added, “We think the Ratification ought to be dated 21st day May 5815."

Officially, the Supreme Council, 33°, N.M.J. dates itself from May 15, 1867. This was the date of the "Union of 1867", when it merged with the competing Cerneau "Supreme Council" in New York. The current Ancient and Accepted Scottish Rite, Northern Masonic Jurisdiction of the United States, was thus formed.

The headquarters of the NMJ was located in downtown Boston for much of the 19th and 20th century moving to Lexington, Massachusetts in 1968. In 2013, the headquarters building was sold to the town of Lexington, with the offices of the Sovereign Grand Commander moving into the Scottish Rite Masonic Museum & Library located next door.

Organization
In the Northern Jurisdiction, the Supreme Council consists of no more than 66 members. All members of the Supreme Council are designated Sovereign Grand Inspectors General, but the head of the Rite in each Valley of the Northern Jurisdiction is called a "Deputy of the Supreme Council."  The Northern Council meets yearly. The current Sovereign Grand Commander is Ill. Peter J. Samiec, 33° who was installed as the 22nd Sovereign Grand Commander in August 2021.

In the Northern Jurisdiction, there is a 46-month requirement for eligibility to receive the 33rd degree, and while there is a Meritorious Service Award (as well as a Distinguished Service Award), they are not required intermediate steps towards the 33°.

A recipient of the 33rd Degree is an honorary member of the Supreme Council and is therefore called an "Inspector General Honorary."  However, those who are appointed Deputies of the Supreme Council that are later elected to membership on the Supreme Council are then designated "Sovereign Grand Inspectors General."  In the Northern Jurisdiction a recipient of the 33rd Degree is an honorary member of the Supreme Council, and all members are referred to as a "Sovereign Grand Inspectors General."

Leadership
The head of the NMJ is the Sovereign Grand Commander. A total of 22 men have held this office since 1813. The list of Sovereign Grand Commanders is as follows:

 Daniel Decius Tompkins (1813–1825)
 Sampson Simson (1825–1832)
 John James Joseph Gourgas (1832–1851)
 Giles Fonda Yates (1851)
 Edward Asa Raymond (1851–1860)
 Killian Henry Van Rensselaer (1860–1867)
 Josiah Hayden Drummond (1867–1879)
 Henry Lynde Palmer (1879–1909)
 Samuel Crocker Lawrence (1909–1910)
 Barton Smith (1910–1921)
 Leon Martin Abbott (1921–1932)
 Frederic Beckwith Stevens (1932–1933)
 Melvin Maynard Johnson (1933–1953)
 George Edward Bushnell (1953–1965)
 George Adelbert Newbury (1965–1975)
 Stanley Fielding Maxwell (1975–1985)
 Francis George Paul (1985–1993)
 Robert Odel Ralston (1993–2003)
 Walter Ernest Webber (2003–2006)
 John William McNaughton (2006–2017)
 David Alan Glattly (2017–2021)
 Peter John Samiec (2021–present)

Degree structure
Members of the Northern Jurisdiction are required to have achieved the third degree of Masonry (Master Mason) in their local lodges before they can apply to join the Scottish Rite.  The Northern Jurisdiction offers 29 additional degrees, with a final 33rd degree conferred as an honor for service to the fraternity and society. However, taking these additional degrees does not give one higher "rank" in Masonry. While the higher numbering might imply a hierarchy, the additional degrees are considered "appendant degrees". They represent a lateral movement in Masonic education rather than an upward movement, and are degrees of instruction rather than rank.

In 2004, the Northern Jurisdiction rewrote and reorganized its degrees.  Further changes have occurred in 2006.  As of 2016 the degrees offered by the Northern Jurisdiction are:

References

Masonic organizations
Masonic rites